Fleadh is an archaic spelling of the Irish word , meaning a festive occasion or banquet. It is used by a number of festivals such as The Philadelphia Fleadh, which have an Irish-originated inspiration. It may also refer to:

 Fleadh Cheoil, an Irish music competition run by Comhaltas Ceoltóirí Éireann
 Fleadh Nua, an Irish cultural festival.